Afsana Mimi (born 20 December 1968) is a Bangladeshi actress, model and director.

Early life
Mimi was born on 20 December 1968 at the Holy Family Hospital, Dhaka in the then East Pakistan. Her maternal ancestors are from Bagerhat.

Career 
Mimi started her acting career through the theater troupe Nagorik Natya Sampradaya. Her last play was Prachyanat's Raja Ebong Onnanno in 2011. Mimi got her breakthrough in acting in Bengali television drama Kothao Keu Nei in 1990.

Mimi started directing in 2000. She directed Kaser Manush. She worked on a cooking show on ATN News named Nostalgia.

Mimi serves as the director of Ichchhetola, a cultural centre in Dhaka.

As of December 2021, Mimi has been working on a film titled Paap Punno, directed by Giasuddin Selim.

Currently Afsana Mimi working as the Director at Shilapkala Academy, Bangladesh.

Works 

Director
 Doll's House (2007-2009)
 Poush Phaguner Pala (2012)
 Samantaral
 Biprotip
 Nairit
 Bonhi

Web series 
 Nikhoj (2022)

References

External links 
 
 

Living people
1968 births
People from Dhaka
University of Dhaka alumni
Bangladeshi television actresses
Bangladeshi film actresses
Best TV Actress Meril-Prothom Alo Critics Choice Award winners